Miss Republic of the Philippines or Miss RP is a beauty pageant in the Philippines currently held biennially (every two years).

History
Miss Republic of the Philippines was first staged in 1969 under Ferdie Villar of Spotlight Promotions. The winner was chosen as the official delegate of the Philippines to the Miss World pageant.

The Runners-up of Miss Republic of the Philippines were awarded as Miss Luzon (1st Runner-up), Miss Visayas (2nd Runner-up), Miss Mindanao (3rd Runner-up) and Miss Manila (4th Runner-up).

Miss RP representation for Miss World lasted until 1976, when the Miss World franchise was transferred to Mutya ng Pilipinas, Miss Republic of the Philippines 1976 Josephine Conde crowned Peachy Veneracion in 1977 the first Mutya ng Pilipinas – World, to distinguish it from the other winner of Mutya ng Pilipinas who competes in the Miss Asia Quest.

Titleholders
The winners were awarded as Miss Republic of the Philippines of the succeeding calendar year, as the pageant is held almost at the end of the year, however they compete in the Miss World of the year they actually won the local title.

1970 to 1977 - Miss Republic of the Philippines (selection for Miss World 1969 to 1976)

2015 to present - The Revival: Miss RP (scholarship-based pageant) 
After a long hiatus, Miss Republic of the Philippines was revived in 2015 and re-branded with a new vision and trust by Successful Entrepreneur, Finance Software Architect and one of Philippines’ Best Dressed Women, Miss Lynette Padolina.

Cash prize and scholarship grant for a four-year college course or post-graduate studies, were given to the winners. Aside from the top title of Miss Republic of the Philippines, three equal ranking runners-up title of Miss RP-Luzon, Miss RP-Visayas and Miss RP-Mindanao were also awarded in 2015 alongside another title of Miss RP International intended for the Overseas Filipino Delegates of the pageant.
In 2018, a Mr Republic of the Philippines was added with three respective runners-up.

Miss World Representatives from 1966 to 1976
Prior to Mutya ng Pilipinas – World, the Philippines' delegates to Miss World from 1966 to 1968 were selected by various pageant organizers. From 1969 to 1976, delegates were determined by winning  at the Miss Republic of the Philippines pageant. Philippines at International Beauty Pageant

See also

List of beauty contests

References

Beauty pageants in the Philippines
Miss World by country